Succinate receptor 1 is a protein that in humans is encoded by the SUCNR1 gene.

References

Further reading

G protein-coupled receptors